Kunwar Raghuraj Pratap Singh (born 31 October 1969), popularly known as Raja Bhaiya, is an Indian politician. He is an MLA in the 18th Uttar Pradesh Assembly from his native local assembly constituency Kunda on Jansatta Dal (Loktantrik) ticket.

On 16 November 2018, Singh announced he is forming his own party, the Jansatta Dal Loktantrik.

Early life and education
Raja Bhaiya was born on 31 October 1969 in Kolkata, West Bengal. His father is Uday Pratap Singh and hails from the royal Bhadri (estate) of Oudh. His grandfather Bajrang Bahadur Singh was the founder vice-chancellor of Pant Nagar Agriculture University and later the second governor of Himachal Pradesh state. Raghuraj was the first in his family to enter politics; his father is largely a recluse. 

Bajrang Bahadur Singh had no child, so he adopted his nephew Uday Pratap Singh as his son.

Raghuraj Singh graduated from University of Lucknow in 1989. He married Bhanvi Kumari Singh on 15 February 1995, with whom he has two sons and two daughters. Singh is an agriculturalist by profession.

Notable election results

2007 Uttar Pradesh election results
In the 2007 Uttar Pradesh Legislative Assembly election, he was overwhelmingly elected from Kunda with a margin of nearly half the votes cast over Shiv Prakash Mishra of the Bahujan Samaj Party.  He had stood as an Independent. 

He also wields considerable influence over five assembly constituencies in the Pratapgarh region, as well as some in neighbouring Bihar. In election rallies in this region where he is present, the actual candidate may never speak or even be mentioned in his speech; "they are all shadows. Raja Bhaiya, alone, is the substance."

After the 2007 elections, when Mayawati swept to power with a majority, Raghuraj again came under the police radar.

2017 Uttar Pradesh election results
In the 2017 Assembly election, Raghuraj Pratap Singh defeated his opponent Janki Sharan from the Bhartiya Janata Party by a huge margin of 103,647 votes and acquired 136,597 votes in total.

2022 Uttar Pradesh election results
In the 2022 Uttar Pradesh Legislative Assembly election, Singh representing Jansatta Dal (Loktantrik) defeated Samajwadi Party's Gulshan Yadav by a margin of 30,315 votes, acquiring a total of 99,612. Singh has consecutively been elected as the representative of Kunda assembly for the seventh time in 2022.

Controversies and conflict

Jailed under POTA in 2002 
In 2002, on an FIR filed by a dissident Bharatiya Janata Party (BJP) MLA Puran Singh Bundela of alleged kidnapping and threatening with dire consequences, got Raghuraj arrested on the orders of then Chief Minister Mayawati at the early hours about 4:00 a.m. of 2 November 2002. Later Mayawati-led government in Uttar Pradesh declared him a terrorist, and he was sent to jail under Prevention of Terrorism Act (POTA), along with his father Uday Pratap Singh and cousin Akshay Pratap Singh. Subsequently, Akshay managed to get bail, but Raghuraj's pleas were rejected many times.

From jail to cabinet minister
Within 25 minutes of the Mulayam Singh Yadav's government coming to power in 2003, all POTA charges against him were dropped. However, the Supreme Court debarred the state government from dismissing POTA charges.

Eventually the POTA Act was repealed in 2004, and although the court again refused to release Raghuraj. He subsequently became a powerful man in the government, and was accused by police officer R.S. Pandey (who led the raid on his house) of having launched a vendetta against him. Eventually R.S. Pandey was killed in a road accident, which is currently being investigated by the CBI.

In 2005, he became the minister for Food and Civil Supplies, and despite his pending criminal cases, he came to be assigned the highest level of security (Z-category) provided by the state, though the threats against him were not specified.

In 2018, he voted for the Bharatiya Janta Party in the Rajya Sabha polls against the BSP candidate Dr. Ambedkar.

His party contested the Lok Sabha polls alone on two seats of Pratapgarh and Kaushambi.

DSP Zia Ul Haque murder case 
On 3 March 2013, Deputy Superintendent of Police (DSP) Zia Ul Haq was killed during clashes between villagers and police in Kunda, Raghuraj Pratap Singh alias Raja Bhaiya's constituency. Following a complaint by the slain officer's wife, Parveen Azad, Pratapgarh police registered a case against Raja Bhaiya for his alleged involvement in the 'conspiracy' which resulted in the gang war and subsequent murder of the police officer. In the FIR, Parveen said that her husband was killed by the henchmen of Raja Bhaiya. She named Gulshan Yadav, chairman of Kunda Nagar Panchayat, Harion Srivastava, a representative of Raja Bhaiya, and Guddu Singh, Raja Bhaiya's driver as prime accused. She also named two other villagers – Kamta Prasad Pal and Rajesh Kumar Pal. The police registered a murder case against other accused who were named in the FIR. Further, this case was handed over to the elite investigation agency CBI on 7 February 2013 for further investigation. The CBI registered four different cases in the murder of senior police officer Zia-ul-Haq and two others who were shot dead on Saturday in the constituency of former Uttar Pradesh minister, Raja Bhaiya.

On 1 August 2013, the CBI filed the final report in the CBI court giving a clean chit to Raja Bhaiya.

Positions held 

 Minister in Mulayam Singh Yadav ministry
 Minister of Food and Civil Supplies in Akhilesh Yadav ministry 
 Minister in Kalyan Singh ministry
 Minister in Rajnath Singh ministry 
 Minister in Ram Prakash Gupta ministry

Charity and social work
In November 2019, Singh announced bearing of all the treatment-related expenses for a six year old cancer patient named Vidushi. Every year since 1993, Singh organises collective wedding (saamuhik vivah) of hundreds of those girls whose families can't afford marriage expenses.

See also 
 Pratapgarh (Lok Sabha constituency)
 List of people from Pratapgarh
 Bhadri State

References

External links
 

1969 births
Living people
People from Kolkata
People from Pratapgarh district, Uttar Pradesh
Prisoners and detainees of India
Crime in Uttar Pradesh
Criminals from Uttar Pradesh
POTA detainees
Jansatta Dal (Loktantrik) politicians
Uttar Pradesh MLAs 2017–2022
Uttar Pradesh MLAs 2022–2027